Dim is a rural locality (a selo) in Dimsky Selsoviet of Mikhaylovsky District, Amur Oblast, Russia. The population was 681 as of 2018. There are 16 streets.

Geography 
Dim is located on the right bank of the Dim River, 21 km west of Poyarkovo (the district's administrative centre) by road. Poyarkovo is the nearest rural locality.

References 

Rural localities in Mikhaylovsky District, Amur Oblast